Joe Giles-Harris (born April 1, 1997) is an American football linebacker who is a free agent. He played college football at Duke.

College career 
During his time with the Blue Devils, Giles-Harris had 313 total career tackles along with 9 and a half sacks, two interceptions, one forced fumble, and one fumble recovery.

Professional career

Jacksonville Jaguars
Giles-Harris went undrafted in the 2019 NFL Draft. He was signed by the Jacksonville Jaguars as an undrafted free agent on April 27, 2019. He was waived on September 2, 2019 and was re-signed to the practice squad. He was promoted to the active roster on October 21, 2019. He was waived again on November 2, 2019 and re-signed to the practice squad. He was promoted back to the active roster on December 5, 2019.

On September 5, 2020, Giles-Harris was waived by the Jaguars and signed to the practice squad the next day. He was placed on the practice squad/COVID-19 list by the team on October 17, 2020, and was activated back to the practice squad on October 22. He was elevated to the active roster on November 7 and November 14 for the team's weeks 9 and 10 games against the Houston Texans and Green Bay Packers, and reverted to the practice squad after each game. He was signed to the active roster on November 21, 2020. In Week 14 against the Tennessee Titans, Giles-Harris recorded his first career sack on Ryan Tannehill during the 31–10 loss. He was waived after the season on May 4, 2021.

Buffalo Bills
On May 16, 2021, Giles-Harris signed a one year contract with the Buffalo Bills. He was waived on August 31, 2021 and re-signed to the practice squad the next day. After the Bills were eliminated in the Divisional Round of the 2021 playoffs, he signed a reserve/future contract on January 24, 2022.

On August 30, 2022, Giles-Harris was waived by the Bills and signed to the practice squad the next day. He was released on January 17, 2023.

NFL Statistics

Regular season

References

External links
 

Living people
1997 births
American football linebackers
Buffalo Bills players
Duke Blue Devils football players
Jacksonville Jaguars players
People from Nyack, New York
Players of American football from New York (state)
Saint Joseph Regional High School alumni
Sportspeople from the New York metropolitan area